This is a list of foreign players in the Korea National League.

 Players in bold are currently playing in the Korea National League.
 As for dual citizen, nationality is listed under Korea National League player official registration.
 Foreign players system was introduced 2010 season.

Asia (AFC)

China PR
 Bai Zijian (2012 Goyang KB Kookmin Bank)

Europe (UEFA)

France
 Ugo Gostisbehere (2014 Gimhae FC)

Serbia
 Ivan Marković (2013 Gimhae FC)

South America (CONMEBOL)

Argentina
 Emmanuel Frances (2011 Ansan Hallelujah)

Brazil
 Naldinho (2010 Suwon FC)
 Vinicius (2010 Ulsan Hyundai Mipo Dockyard)
 Alex (2010–2011 Ulsan Hyundai Mipo Dockyard)
 Danilo (2011 Ulsan Hyundai Mipo Dockyard)
 Roni (2011–2012 Ulsan Hyundai Mipo Dockyard)
 Thiago Santos (2012 Ulsan Hyundai Mipo Dockyard)
 Alex Rafael (2014 Ulsan Hyundai Mipo Dockyard)
 Ricardo Augusto (2014 Ulsan Hyundai Mipo Dockyard)
 Allisson Ricardo (2014 Ulsan Hyundai Mipo Dockyard)

See also
 Korea National League

References

External links

Korea National League
 

Association football player non-biographical articles